Matad is a sum (district) of Dornod Province in eastern Mongolia. The population of the sum as of 2009 is 2,526, of which 834 live in the sum center. The area of the sum is 22,831 km² and the population density is 0.11 people/km².

Climate

Matad has a semi-arid climate (Köppen climate classification BSk) with warm summers and severely cold winters. Most precipitation falls in the summer as rain, with some snow in autumn and spring. Winters are very dry.

References

Districts of Dornod Province